Elchesheim-Illingen is a village in southwestern Germany, located between Karlsruhe and Rastatt. The Rhine flows 5 km west of the village.

Population

Elchesheim-Illingen has 3208 inhabitants and is 10.15 square kilometres large (including forest and countryside).

Neighbour towns and villages
Elchesheim-Illingen borders on the following towns, clockwise beginning from the north:
Au am Rhein, Durmersheim, Bietigheim (Baden), Steinmauern.

Geography

The village is located near the river Rhine, also there are "Rheinauen", old channels of the river. In this area are many forests, also there is the Goldkanal (goldcanal), an old lake where gold was found.

The nearest big city is Karlsruhe. In the near of this region is the famous Black Forest (German: Schwarzwald). The nearest airport is the Airport Karlsruhe/Baden-Baden.

Mayors
1971–1987: Klemens Wittmann
1987–2003: Kurt Hertweck
2003–2011: Joachim Ertl
since 2011: Rolf Spiegelhalder

References

Rastatt (district)